Əmbizlər (also, Ambizlyar) is a village in the Khizi Rayon of Azerbaijan.  The village forms part of the municipality of Ağdərə.

References 

Populated places in Khizi District